Alessandro Moresche Rodríguez,  also known as "Moresche" (born June 6, 1971) is a retired Brazilian footballer who played for Fluminense in the Copa do Brasil. Rodríguez has gone on to play for a number of clubs across around the world making him a journey man and making him a key to most of the clubs' success.

References

1971 births
Living people
Association football forwards
Brazilian footballers
Brazilian expatriate footballers
Fluminense FC players
Zamalek SC players
C.D. FAS footballers
A.D. Isidro Metapán footballers
Expatriate footballers in Egypt
Expatriate footballers in Saudi Arabia
Expatriate footballers in Venezuela
Expatriate footballers in El Salvador
Brazilian expatriate sportspeople in Egypt
Brazilian expatriate sportspeople in Saudi Arabia
Brazilian expatriate sportspeople in Venezuela
Brazilian expatriate sportspeople in El Salvador
Egyptian Premier League players
Footballers from Rio de Janeiro (city)